Lynne Sharon Schwartz (born March 19, 1939) is an American prose and poetry writer.

Biography
Schwartz grew up in Brooklyn, the second of three children of Jack M. Sharon, a lawyer and accountant, and Sarah Slatus Sharon; she married Harry Schwartz in 1957. She holds a BA (1959) from Barnard College, an MA (1961) from Bryn Mawr, and started work on a PhD at NYU. Schwartz has taught in many universities and writing programs, including Bryn Mawr, Columbia, the University of Michigan, Washington University, Rice, and the University of Iowa Writers' Workshop.  She is currently on faculty in the Writing Seminars MFA program at Bennington College.   Lynne Sharon Schwartz lives in New York City, and has set a number of her books there as well.  Though Schwartz is perhaps best known for her novels, her work spans a number of genres, from fiction to poetry to memoir, criticism, and translation from Italian.

Selected works
Crossing Borders (Seven Stories Press, 2018)
Two-Part Inventions (Counterpoint, 2012), a novel based on the story of Joyce Hatto and William Barrington-Coupe
The Emergence of Memory: Conversations With W.G. Sebald (Seven Stories Press, 2007)
The Writing on the Wall: A Novel (Counterpoint, 2005)
Referred Pain and Other Stories (Counterpoint Press, 2004)
In Solitary: Poems (Sheep Meadow, 2002)
Face to Face: A Reader in the World (Beacon Press, 2000)
In the Family Way: an Urban Comedy (William Morrow, 1999)
Ruined by Reading:  A Life in Books (Beacon Press, 1996)
The Fatigue Artist (Scribner, 1995) 
The Four Questions (Picture Puffins, 1994)
Leaving Brooklyn (Houghton Mifflin, 1989)
We are talking about homes: A great university against its neighbors (Harper & Row, 1985)
Disturbances in the Field (HarperCollins, 1983)
Balancing Acts (HarperCollins, 1981)
Rough Strife (HarperCollins, 1980)
See You In The Dark, a poetry collection
Not Now, Voyager, a memoir

References

1939 births
Living people
American women novelists
American women poets
American women short story writers
American women essayists
American memoirists
American women memoirists
20th-century American novelists
20th-century American women writers
21st-century American novelists
21st-century American poets
21st-century American women writers
20th-century translators
21st-century American translators
Italian–English translators
Writers from Brooklyn
Poets from New York (state)
Barnard College alumni
Bryn Mawr College alumni
New York University alumni
Bryn Mawr College faculty
Columbia University faculty
Washington University in St. Louis faculty
Rice University faculty
Iowa Writers' Workshop faculty
Bennington College faculty
University of Michigan faculty
20th-century American short story writers
21st-century American short story writers
20th-century American essayists
21st-century American essayists
PEN/Faulkner Award for Fiction winners
Novelists from Pennsylvania
Novelists from Texas
Novelists from Michigan
Novelists from Missouri
Novelists from New York (state)
Novelists from Iowa
Novelists from Vermont